Eric Branscum (born July 8, 1984) is an American screenwriter. He is best known for his work on VeggieTales in the House.

Early life
Branscum was born in Dayton, Ohio. He studied Film at the University of Toledo.

Career
Branscum has written 66 episodes of VeggieTales in the House and was story editor for 2 seasons of VeggieTales in the City for DreamWorks Animation. He is a member of The Animation Guild, I.A.T.S.E. Local 839.

Branscum is featured in issue #2 of print humor magazine The American Bystander.

He currently works as a scripted creator for The Daily Wire.

References

External links
 Official Website 
 

1984 births
Living people
People from Dayton, Ohio
University of Toledo alumni
American comedy writers
American Christians
Screenwriters from Ohio